Chinese Peak may refer to:

Chinese Peak (California), a mountain in California
Chinese Peak (Idaho), a mountain in Idaho